Egburt E. Woodbury (March 29, 1861 – March 13, 1920) was an American lawyer and politician.

Life
He was born on March 29, 1861, in Cherry Creek, Chautauqua County, New York. He attended the common schools, and Chamberlain Institute in Randolph. Then he studied law, was admitted to the bar in 1884, and practiced in Jamestown.

He was elected a Justice of the Peace in 1886. He was a member of the New York State Assembly in 1891, 1892 (both Chautauqua Co., 2nd D.) and 1893 (Chautauqua Co.); Surrogate of Chautauqua County from 1901 to 1905; and a State Tax Commissioner from 1906 on.

He was New York Attorney General from 1915 to 1917, elected at the New York state election, 1914, and re-elected at the New York state election, 1916. He resigned on April 19, 1917, due to ill health, and was succeeded by his First Deputy Attorney General Merton E. Lewis.

He died on March 13, 1920, in Jamestown, New York.

Sources
History of Jamestown, NY at history.rays-place.com History of Jamestown
New York State Legislative Souvenir by Henry K. Phelps (1893; pg. 65) 
 His appointment as tax commissioner, in NYT on January 2, 1906
 His appointments for deputies, in NYT on December 19, 1914
 His resignation, in NYT on April 20, 1917
 Merton Lewis declined renomination, in NYT on May 7, 1918
 Obit notice in NYT on March 14, 1920

1861 births
1920 deaths
Politicians from Jamestown, New York
New York State Attorneys General
Republican Party members of the New York State Assembly